Illinois Valley High School is a public high school in Cave Junction, Oregon, United States.

Academics
In 2008, 72% of the school's seniors received a high school diploma. Of 118 students, 85 graduated, 25 dropped out, one received a modified diploma, and seven were still in high school the following year.

In October 2009 the school was removed from the No Child Left Behind safety watch list, due to the following not occurring: "more than 1 percent of their students brought a weapon to school, were expelled for violence or committed a violent crime on campus."

Athletics 
Illinois Valley's high school athletic program began around the time the school did.  The mascot is  the Cougar and the team colors are red and white. The school's logo is taken from a University of Houston athletic image.

The school is a member in good standing of the Oregon School Activities Association, and participates in the Valley Coast Conference. Teams currently play in Class 2A, based on school enrollment.

During the 2020-2021 football season, which was postponed to the Spring due to the Coronavirus pandemic, the high school did not have enough players to field a team, so eligible players joined the Hidden Valley High School team for the season. The Varsity Hidden Valley/Illinois Valley co-op team went 3-0.

References

High schools in Josephine County, Oregon
Cave Junction, Oregon
Public high schools in Oregon